Pododesmus rudis, the false jingle shell, is a species of bivalve mollusc in the family Anomiidae. It can be found along the Atlantic coast of North America, ranging from Florida to the West Indies.

References

Anomiidae
Molluscs described in 1781
Taxa named by Johann Hermann